"Ceremony" is a single by guitarist Joe Satriani, released in 1998 through Epic Records. It is an instrumental track from his seventh studio album, Crystal Planet, and reached No. 28 on the U.S. Billboard Mainstream Rock chart.

Track listing

References

Joe Satriani songs
1998 songs
Rock instrumentals
1998 singles
Epic Records singles